Acarospora thelococcoides is a pruinose (dusty whitish) verruculose (warty) crustose lichen that grows in patches up to 10 cm across that grows on soil (terricolous), especially soils made from decomposed granite. Each roundish areole becomes more pruinose toward the top with has a single round  apothecium (or none) that is immersed with a dark brown disc, so as to appear like a collection of white rings. This appearance gives it the common name, soil eyes lichen.

The asci are saccate, with variable numbers of globose ascospores. Lichen spot tests are all negative, and it is UV-. It is an indicator of undisturbed soil habitats.

References

thelococcoides
Lichen species
Lichens described in 1891
Lichens of Mexico
Lichens of the Southwestern United States
Taxa named by William Nylander (botanist)
Fungi without expected TNC conservation status